Adrian Gjølberg (born 23 February 1989 in Tønsberg) is a former Norwegian cyclist and current Directeur Sportif with Team FixIT.no.

Major results

2008
 3rd Road race, National Under-23 Road Championships
2011
 1st Stage 1 Tour of China
2013
 1st Stage 3 (TTT) Circuit des Ardennes

References

External links

1989 births
Living people
Norwegian male cyclists
Sportspeople from Tønsberg